Little Yazoo is an unincorporated community located in Yazoo County, Mississippi.

Residents are within the Yazoo County School District. Residents are zoned to Yazoo County Middle School and Yazoo County High School.

References

Unincorporated communities in Yazoo County, Mississippi
Unincorporated communities in Mississippi
Mississippi placenames of Native American origin